Alex Nepomniaschy is an American cinematographer. He was born in Moscow in what was then the Soviet Union. Nepomniaschy graduated from the AFI Conservatory's cinematography program with a Master of Fine Arts in 1982.

Awards
At the 1988 Sundance Film Festival, he won the Best Cinematographer Award for his work on Beirut: The Last Home Movie. In 1995 he was given awards for Best Cinematographer by the National Board of Review, and the Boston Society of Film Critics for the film Safe.

Nepomniaschy was nominated in 1989 for an award from the American Society of Cinematographers for the television series, Sable. And was nominated for Best Cinematography in the 2003 Independent Spirit Awards for Narc.

Filmography
 Narc
 Safe
 Never Been Kissed
 Poltergeist III
 It's the Rage
 The Alarmist
 A Time for Dancing
 The End of Innocence
 Rites of Passage

References

1955 births
Living people
Mass media people from Moscow
American cinematographers
AFI Conservatory alumni
Soviet emigrants to the United States